Foxcote may refer to several places in England:

 Foxcote, Gloucestershire, a hamlet in Withington parish
 Foxcote, Somerset, a small village in Hemington parish
 another name for Foscott, Buckinghamshire
 Foxcote Reservoir and Wood, Buckinghamshire